Hanni Ossott (14 February 1946 – 31 December 2002) was a poet, translator and critic from Venezuela. She was born in Caracas and she received her bachelor's degree in the Universidad Central de Venezuela, where she was also a professor. She was awarded the José Antonio Ramos Sucre Prize and the Lazo Martí Prize and she worked as a translator and a critic.

Main works
Hasta que llegue el día y huyan las sombras (1983)
El reino donde la noche se abre (1986)
Plegarias y penumbras (1986)
Cielo, tu arco grande (1989)
Casa de agua y de sombras (1992)
El circo roto (1993).

References

External links 
 Hanni Ossott recorded at the Library of Congress for the Hispanic Division’s audio literary archive on  7 June 1990

Writers from Caracas
Venezuelan women poets
Venezuelan translators
1946 births
2002 deaths
Central University of Venezuela alumni
Academic staff of the Central University of Venezuela
20th-century Venezuelan poets
20th-century translators
20th-century Venezuelan women writers
English–Spanish translators
German–Spanish translators
Venezuelan women educators
Deaths in Venezuela
Death in Caracas